This is a list of films which have placed number one at the weekend box office in Romania during 2020.

List

Highest-grossing films

Miami Bici became the 13th and first Romanian film to surpass the 10 million lei mark, and became the highest grossing Romanian film of all time.

References 

2020
Romania
2020 in Romania